Neil Canton (born 30 May 1948) is an American film producer from New York City best known for his work on the Back to the Future trilogy. Canton currently serves as an instructor and mentor at the American Film Institute Conservatory as a member of the Producing faculty.

His brother, Mark Canton, is also a film producer.

Education
Canton studied at the American University (DC). He graduated in 1970.

Filmography
He was a producer in all films unless otherwise noted.

Film

Miscellaneous crew

Awards
Wins
 Western Heritage Awards: Theatrical Motion Picture, for Geronimo: An American Legend (1993).

Nominations
 BAFTA Awards: BAFTA Film Award Best Film, for Back to the Future (1985).

References

External links

1948 births
Film producers from New York (state)
Living people
Businesspeople from New York City
American University alumni